Deep Lake may refer to any of several lakes in the U.S. state of Oregon:

There are 5 bodies of water listed as of October 18, 2013.

See also
 List of lakes in Oregon

Lakes of Oregon